The Volkswagen Delivery is the entry-level (5 to 8 tonne GVW) model in the Volkswagen Truck & Bus heavy truck range. It sits above the Volkswagen Commercial Vehicles light commercial vehicle range; Caddy, Transporter, Crafter and Amarok.

The delivery truck gets its name from its vocation of urban and rural pickup and deliveries.

Powered by 140 hp & 150 hp  MWM Euro III compliant Diesel engines.

Specs & Range
 5.140
 8.150

References

External links
Volkswagen Delivery International portal
Volkswagen Caminhões e Ônibus (Volkswagen Trucks and Buses) - press site (English/Brazilian)

Delivery